The Schwarzgold-Rennen is a Group 3 flat horse race in Germany open to three-year-old thoroughbred fillies. It is run over a distance of 1,600 metres (about 1 mile) at Cologne in May.

History
The event is named after Schwarzgold, a filly whose victories included the Preis der Diana and Deutsches Derby in 1940. "Schwarzgold-Rennen" is a previous title of several other races, including the German 1,000 Guineas (1941–88), the Hamburger Stutenmeile (1995–98) and the Diana-Trial (2004–07).

The present Schwarzgold-Rennen, a trial for the German 1,000 Guineas, was introduced in 2008. It replaced the Kölner Herbst-Stuten-Meile, an autumn race for fillies and mares aged three or older.

Since 2010, the race is run in memory of Baroness Karin von Ullmann, a former owner of Gestüt Schlenderhan, who died in 2009.

Records
Leading jockey (2 wins):
 Andreas Suborics – Peace Royale (2008), Addicted (2009)

Leading trainer (2 wins):
 Andreas Wohler - Peace Royale (2008), Meerjungfrau (2014), Axana (2019)

Winners

See also
 List of German flat horse races

References

 Racing Post:
 galopp-sieger.de – Schwarzgold-Rennen.
 horseracingintfed.com – International Federation of Horseracing Authorities – Schwarzgold-Rennen (2013).

Flat horse races for three-year-old fillies
Sport in Cologne
Horse races in Germany
2008 establishments in Germany
Recurring sporting events established in 2008